WWMA-LP (107.9 FM) is a radio station licensed to Avon Park, Florida, United States.  The station is currently owned by Highlands County Chapter of ASI, and carries some local programming as well as programming rebroadcast from Radio 74 Internationale.

References

External links
 

WMA-LP
WMA-LP
Radio 74 Internationale radio stations
Avon Park, Florida
2005 establishments in Florida
Radio stations established in 2005